Serbia–Slovenia relations  Before 1991, both countries were part of Yugoslavia. Slovenia gained its independence after the Ten-Day War. Both countries established diplomatic relations on 9 December 2000. Serbia has an embassy in Ljubljana. Slovenia has an embassy in Belgrade. 

Both countries are full members of the Central European Initiative and of the Southeast European Cooperative Initiative. Also Serbia is an EU candidate and Slovenia is an EU member.

Serbs are the biggest national minority in Slovenia.

See also 
 Foreign relations of Serbia
 Foreign relations of Slovenia
 Agreement on Succession Issues of the Former Socialist Federal Republic of Yugoslavia

References

External links
 Serbian Ministry of Foreign Affairs about the relation with Slovenia
 Serbian embassy in Ljubljana (in Serbian and Slovenian only)
 Slovenian embassy in Belgrade

 
Slovenia
Bilateral relations of Slovenia